The 1975 SMU Mustangs football team represented Southern Methodist University (SMU) as a member of the Southwest Conference (SWC) during the 1975 NCAA Division I football season. Led by Dave Smith in his third and final year as head coach, the Mustangs compiled an overall record of 4–7 (2–5 in SWC, fifth).

Under mounting pressure, Smith resigned on December 31, and was succeeded by Ron Meyer, the head coach at the University of Nevada, Las Vegas (UNLV), then in Division II.

Schedule

Roster

References

SMU
SMU Mustangs football seasons
SMU Mustangs football